Shah-e Shahidan or Shah Shahidan may refer to:
 Shah-e Shahidan, Fars
 Shah-e Shahidan, Gilan